Nesolestes ranavalona is a species of flat-wing damselfly in the family Argiolestidae.

References

Further reading

 

Calopterygoidea
Articles created by Qbugbot
Insects described in 1951